Sebastian Thekethecheril (born 30 July 1954)  is an Indian prelate of the Roman Catholic Church.

Thekethecheril was ordained a priest on 18 December 1980. He was appointed to the Diocese of Vijayapuram and was ordained a bishop on 2 July 2006.

External links
Catholic-Hierarchy
Verapoly Diocese
(Bishop Sebastian Thekethecheril is standing on the left side)

1954 births
Living people
20th-century Roman Catholic bishops in India